Mawnang (also known as Bawnin) was a small Shan state in the Myelat region of what is today Burma. Its population was mostly Taungyo.

History

Rulers
The rulers of Mawnang bore the title of Myoza. 
.... - ....                Hkam Hon [1st ruler]
.... - ....                Nam Hkam Lin
.... - ....                Maung Ne Dun
.... - ....                Maung Kut
.... - ....                Maung Kye
.... - ....                Maung La
.... - ....                Sao Ta
.... - 1736                Maung Saung
1736 - 1752                Ye Tut
1752 - 1766                Tha Son
1766 - c.1767              Maung Myat (1st time)
c.1767 - 1774              Vacant
1774 - ....                Maung Myat (2nd time)
.... - ....                Naw Hkam Lin
.... - ....                Maung Kaung
.... - ....                Maung Pot
.... - ....                Maung Maung
.... - 1883                Hkun Hkam
1883 - 1886                Hkun Shwe Hkam -Regent
1886 - Apr 1907            Sao Hkim                           (b. 1851 - d. 1907)
Apr 1907 - 19..            Hkun Ti                            (b. 1886 - d. 19..)

References

19th century in Burma
Shan States

ca:Mawnang